Missing You is the twentieth studio album by American singer Peabo Bryson. It was released by Peak Records on October 2, 2007. The album reached number 41 on the US Top R&B/Hip-Hop Albums chart, becoming Bryson's highest-charting album since Can You Stop the Rain (1991).

Critical reception

AllMusic editor William Ruhlmann found that Missing You "is not without its contemporary touches, notably in the computer-generated rhythm tracks. But Bryson is not really out to compete with Usher and R. Kelly for the hearts of teenagers here [...] Missing You is an album intended primarily for Bryson's existing fan base and secondarily for smooth jazz fans [...] This is material the singer will have no problem integrating into a stage act dominated by his greatest hits, and it should be welcomed by those who enjoyed his earlier work. It may have been a long time between albums, but musically Bryson acts as though no time at all has passed."

Track listing

Notes
  denotes an additional producer
  denotes a co-producer

Personnel and credits 
Musicians

 Peabo Bryson – lead vocals, backing  vocals (2, 6, 9), keyboards (3, 4), programming (3, 4, 8, 11), lead acoustic guitar (6)
 Barry Eastmond – keyboards (1, 5, 9, 10), drum programming (1, 3, 9, 11), arrangements (1, 5, 9), additional keyboards (3, 4, 11), programming (3, 4, 11), horn and string arrangements (4), acoustic piano (8), Rhodes (8), strings (8)
 The Heavyweights – instruments (2)
 Marc Freeman – keyboards (4), programming (4), horn and string arrangements (4)
 Blake Eiseman – programming (4)
 Peter Stengaard – programming (6), instruments (6)
 Clark Anderson – additional keyboards (6), backing vocals (6)
 Bobby Lyle – acoustic piano (7), keyboards (7), rhythm and string arrangements (7)
 Phil Hamilton – acoustic guitar (1), guitar (9)
 Paul Jackson Jr. – acoustic guitar (7), electric guitar (7)
 Norman Brown – guitar (8)
 Nathaniel Phillips – bass (4, 10)
 Freddie Washington – bass (7)
 Ricky Lawson – drums (4, 10)
 Leon "Ndugu" Chancler – drums (7)
 Munyungo Jackson – percussion (7)
 Boney James – saxophone (7)
 Paul Taylor – alto sax solo (10)
 Eric Butler – string contractor (7)
 Claude Kelly – backing vocals (1)
 Tierra Hart – backing vocals (2)
 Regina Troupe – backing vocals (2, 3, 5, 8, 11), keyboards (3), programming (3, 4), horn and string arrangements (4)
 Kim Riley – backing vocals (3)
 Dwight Watkins – backing vocals (3)
 Gary Brown – backing vocals (9)
 Tara Jamelle Jones – backing vocals (9)

Production

 Peabo Bryson – executive producer (1-6, 8-11)
 Andi Howard – executive producer (1-6, 8-11), A&R  
 Mark Wexler – executive producer (1-6, 8-11)
 Clarence O. Smith – executive producer (7)
 Sahirah Uqdah – co-executive producer, A&R
 Marc Freeman – A&R
 Rick Devarona – recording (1, 3, 4, 5, 8, 9, 11)
 Barry Eastmond – recording (1, 3, 4, 5, 8-11)
 Mike Wilson – recording (2, 3, 4, 10)
 Dennis Moody – recording (4, 10)
 Glenn Matullo – recording (6)
 Peter Stengaard – recording (6), mixing (6)
 Dave Rideau – recording (7), mixing (7)
 Ray Bardani – mixing (1, 9)
 Jason Pennock – mixing (2)
 Nick Sodano – mixing (3, 4, 8, 10, 11)
 Stan Wallace – mixing (5)
 Isaiah Abolin – assistant engineer (1, 9)
 Dave Adams – assistant engineer (3, 4, 8, 10, 11)
 Aaron Holton – assistant engineer (3, 4, 8, 10), recording (11)
 Justin Trawick – assistant engineer (3, 4)
 Luke Graham – assistant engineer (4, 10)
 Chris King – assistant engineer (10)
 Vic Anesini – mastering 
 Sonny Mediana – art direction, package design 
 Mike Ruiz – photography 
 David Franklin – management

Studios

 Recorded at East Bay Studios (Tarrytown, NY); Legacy Recording Studios (New York, NY); Doppler Studios, Orphan Studios and Patchwerks (Atlanta, GA); Heavyweight Studios (Burbank, CA); Ahhsum Studios (West Covina, CA); Westlake Studios and The It Factory (Hollywood, CA).
 Mixed at Legacy Recording Studios (New York, NY); Five Walls Recording Studios (Pelham, NY); Face Productions (Las Vegas, NV); Westlake Studios and The It Factory (Hollywood, CA).
 Mastered at Sony Music Studios (New York, NY).

Charts

References 

2007 albums
Peabo Bryson albums